Judge Dredd is a franchise based on the comic book strip which appears in the British science fiction anthology 2000 AD. For the lead character, see Judge Dredd (character).

Judge Dredd may also refer to:

 Judge Dredd (IDW Publishing), a 2012–2018 comics series

Films
Judge Dredd (film), a 1995 film based on the character
Dredd, a 2012 film also based on the Judge Dredd character

Games
Judge Dredd (role-playing game), four role-playing games based around the character, including:
Judge Dredd: The Role-Playing Game, Games Workshop, 1985
The Judge Dredd Roleplaying Game, Mongoose, 2002
Judge Dredd (board game), a 1982 game from Games Workshop
 Judge Dredd (1986 video game), a platform game
 Judge Dredd (1990 video game), a platform game
Judge Dredd (pinball), a 1993 pinball game
Judge Dredd (1995 video game), a platform game based on the film
Judge Dredd (1997 video game), a shooter game
Judge Dredd: Dredd Vs. Death, a 2003 first-person shooter video game

See also
 Judge Dread (1945–1998), British musician
 Dredd (disambiguation)